Kotor is a coastal town in Montenegro.

Kotor or KOTOR may refer to:

Kotor (Bosnia), also known as Kotorgrad (Kotor town), a medieval fortress above the settlement of Kotor in Kotor Varoš, Bosnia and Herzegovina
Kotor Municipality, a municipality in Montenegro with its administrative center in Kotor
KOTOR, or KotOR, an abbreviation for Star Wars: Knights of the Old Republic
Kotor-class frigate, light frigates built for the Yugoslav Navy during the 1980s

See also
 Bay of Kotor, Adriatic bay named after the town of Kotor
 Kotor Varoš or Kotor-Varoš, a town and municipality located in northwestern Republika Srpska, Bosnia and Herzegovina